Cloverbank Country Club is a country club in Hamburg, New York. It offers various activities, such as bowling, swimming, tennis, and golf. The club has a "members only" policy. Under new management, the club has undergone extensive renovations and course improvements. Prior to 2021, the club operated as the Brierwood Country Club.

Golf course and amenities
The golf course was designed by Martin & Martin and opened in 1959.

The course is a par 72, measuring just over 7,050 yards from the Tournament tees (furthest tees back) and around 6,600 Yards from the men's tees. At these yardages, it has received a slope of 130 with an overall golf course rating of 73.6 by the United States Golf Association. The course has since been extended and the Tournament Tees now measure approximately 7,150 yards, which has added even more difficulty to the already advanced course set up. The course is well known for hole number 11, which is a par 3 that plays at 190 yards over a large man-made pond with a fountain, and a green surrounded by sand dunes. It is only the third longest out of the four par 3's located on the course.

References

External links
 Official club website
 Arnold Palmer Golf Management website
 Century Golf Partners website

Sports venues in Erie County, New York
Golf clubs and courses in New York (state)
1959 establishments in New York (state)